The 1895 Ohio Green and White football team was an American football team that represented Ohio University as an independent during the 1895 college football season. In its second season of intercollegiate football, Ohio compiled a 2–3 record and was outscored by a total of 128 to 78. Harvey Derne was the team's head coach; it was Derne's first and only season in the position. The team's 60–0 victory over Lancaster set a record for the largest margin of victory in school history. That record stood for 21 years.

Schedule

References

Ohio
Ohio Bobcats football seasons
Ohio Green and White football